The Aljunied Group Representation Constituency is a five-member group representation constituency (GRC) in the north-eastern and eastern region of Singapore. The GRC consists of five divisions: Eunos, Bedok Reservoir-Punggol, Kaki Bukit, Serangoon and Paya Lebar. The current members of parliament are Pritam Singh, Sylvia Lim, Gerald Giam, Leon Perera and Muhamad Faisal Manap from the Worker's Party (WP).

History
Aljuined GRC consists of a large part of Hougang (excluding Hougang SMC), Paya Lebar, Serangoon Gardens, the southern half of Serangoon North as well as a portion of Bedok and a very small section of Tampines. It absorbed the Eunos and Kaki Bukit wards of Eunos GRC as well as the Punggol East and Punggol South divisions of Cheng San GRC. 

Aljunied GRC was formed in 1988 and won by the People's Action Party (PAP). The Workers' Party team which was led by then-WP leader Low Thia Khiang successfully first won the GRC from the PAP in the 2011 general election, making it the first GRC to be won by the opposition since the introduction of the GRC concept in 1988 with the winning team with 54.72% of the votes against the People's Action Party team led by George Yeo with 45.28%.

In the following general election in 2015, the Workers' Party which was led by then-WP leader Low Thia Khiang  managed to retain back the GRC, winning 50.96% of the vote against the People's Action Party team including Yeo Guat Kwang and four first-time candidates, who garnered a vote share of 49.04%.

Between 2011 and 2020, Aljunied GRC was led by Low Thia Khiang; he was succeeded by Pritam Singh as part of a leadership renewal process, but he still remains active in politics.

In the 2020 general election, Low Thia Khiang and Chen Show Mao declined to run for re-election; the 2020 election saw the Workers' Party which was led by WP leader Pritam Singh  retain back the GRC with 59.95% of the vote, a 9% swing from the previous election against the People's Action Party team, who won 40.05%.

Members of Parliament

Electoral results

Elections in 1980s

Elections in 1990s

Elections in 2000s

Elections in 2010s

Elections in 2020s

See also
Aljunied SMC

References

Singaporean electoral divisions
Bedok
Hougang
Paya Lebar
Serangoon
Tampines